Olusjerd (also Romanized as Olūsjerd, Aloosjerd, and Alūsjerd; also known as Alūsgerd, Alasjerd, and Ulāskird) is a village in Nur Ali Beyk Rural District, in the Central District of Saveh County, Markazi Province, Iran. At the 2006 census, its population was 1,594, in 413 families.

References 

Populated places in Saveh County